Events from the year 1711 in Sweden

Incumbents
 Monarch – Charles XII

Events

 Great Northern War plague outbreak
 
 
 
 
 
 The profession of midwifery is regulated and all future midwives are to be licensed by the Collegium Medicum after having been tutored by an already licensed midwife for a period of two years and passed the examination of a doctor before being allowed to practice their trade (until 1777, this applied only to the capital): the midwives are also banned from using instruments.

Births

  5 March – Carl Gustaf Pilo, painter (died 1793) 
 
 

 23 May - Ulla Tessin, courtier  (died 1768) 
 
 Niclas Gustaf Duncan, spy (died 1771)
 Françoise Marguerite Janiçon, writer (died 1789)

Deaths

References

 
Years of the 18th century in Sweden
Sweden